Composite construction is a generic term to describe any building construction involving multiple dissimilar materials.  Composite construction is often used in building aircraft, watercraft, and building construction. There are several reasons to use composite materials including increased strength, aesthetics, and environmental sustainability.

Structural engineering 
In structural engineering, composite construction exists when two different materials are bound together so strongly that they act together as a single unit from a structural point of view.  When this occurs, it is called composite action.  One common example involves steel beams supporting concrete floor slabs.  If the beam is not connected firmly to the slab, then the slab transfers all of its weight to the beam and the slab contributes nothing to the load carrying capability of the beam.  However, if the slab is connected positively to the beam with studs, then a portion of the slab can be assumed to act compositely with the beam.  In effect, this composite creates a larger and stronger beam than would be provided by the steel beam alone.  The structural engineer may calculate a transformed section as one step in analyzing the load carry capability of the composite beam.

House building 
A flitch beam is a simple form of composite construction sometimes used in North American light frame construction.  This occurs when a steel plate is sandwiched between two wood joists and bolted together.  A flitch beam can typically support heavier loads over a longer span than an all-wood beam of the same cross section.

Deck construction

Composite wood decking
The traditional decking material is pressure-treated wood. The current material many contractors choose to use is composite decking. This material is typically made from wood-plastic composite or Fiberglass Reinforced Plastic (FRP). Such materials do not warp, crack, or split and are as versatile as traditional pressure treated wood. Composite decking is made through several different processes, and there are a multitude of sizes, shapes, and strengths available. Depending on the type of composite selected the decking materials can be used for a number of other construction projects including fences and sheds.

Composite steel deck
In a composite steel deck, the dissimilar materials in question are steel and concrete. A composite steel deck combines the tensile strength of steel with the compressive strength of concrete to improve design efficiency and reduce the material necessary to cover a given area. Additionally, composite steel decks supported by composite steel joists can span greater distances between supporting elements and have reduced live load deflection in comparison to previous construction methods.

Cement-polymer composites 
Cement-polymer composites are being developed and tested as a replacement for traditional cement. The traditional cement used as stucco rapidly deteriorates. The deterioration causes the material to easily crack due to thermo-processes becoming permeable to water and no longer structurally sound. The United States Environmental Protection Agency in conjunction with  Materials and Electrochemical Research Corporation tested a cement-polymer composite material consisting of crumb rubber made from recycled rubber tires and cement. It was found that 20% crumb rubber can be added to the cement mixture without affecting the appearance of the cement.  This new material was tested for strength and durability using American Society for Testing and Materials (ASTM International) standards.

High-performance composites 
A newer but growing sector in the composite construction sector is the high-performance decking that comes from companies like Trex Decking and Fiberon. High performance composite decking has emerged in recent years to combat earlier generations of composite decking like wood plastic composite (WPCs) that were struggling to maintain credibility in the marketplace.

Research is showing now, however, that consumers are choosing composite decking products over wood 11 times to 1. Initial concerns regarding moisture intrusion in composite decks has led to the rise of high performance decking products with protective shells, often referred to as “capped composite decking.”

Capped composite decks have a high performance finish with the addition of the shell that is often called a “cap-stock.” This shell covers either all four sides of the composite board or just the top and sides, depending on the brand. Manufacturers apply the cap to the board using a process called co-extrusion. Most capped composite decking comes with some kind of warranty against stains and fading.

See also 
Structural analysis
Composite material
Reinforced concrete
Framing (construction)
Construction

References 

Civil engineering
Construction
Building materials
Prestressed concrete construction